Castrovalva is a lithograph print by the Dutch artist M. C. Escher, first printed in February 1930.  Like many of Escher's early works, it depicts a place that he visited on a tour of Italy.

It depicts the Abruzzo village of Castrovalva, which lies at the top of a sheer slope. The perspective is toward the northwest, from the narrow trail on the left which, at the point from which this view is seen, makes a hairpin turn to the right, descending to the valley. In the foreground at the side of the trail, there are several flowering plants, grasses, ferns, a beetle and a snail. In the expansive valley below there are cultivated fields and two more towns, the nearest of which is Anversa degli Abruzzi, with Casale in the distance.

In popular culture

In 1982 the name "Castrovalva" was used in a story in the BBC television series Doctor Who. The storyline also relied heavily on recursion, a favorite theme in Escher's later and more famous works, and used ideas taken from Belvedere, Ascending and Descending, and Relativity to trap the protagonists in the city of Castrovalva.  
The comic Kingdom of the Wicked is set in an imaginary world named Castrovalva.

Sources
 Locher, J.L. (2000). The Magic of M. C. Escher. Harry N. Abrams, Inc. .

Works by M. C. Escher
1930 paintings
Abruzzo